Leptogaster is a genus of robber flies in the family Asilidae. There are at least 260 described species in Leptogaster.

See also
 List of Leptogaster species

References

Further reading

External links

 

Asilidae genera
Articles created by Qbugbot